Isaac Liev Schreiber (born October 4, 1967) is an American actor, director, screenwriter, producer, and narrator. He became known during the late 1990s and early 2000s after appearing in several independent films, and later mainstream Hollywood films, including the first three Scream horror films (1996-2000), Ransom (1996), Phantoms (1998), The Hurricane (1999), Kate & Leopold (2001), The Sum of All Fears (2002), The Manchurian Candidate (2004), The Omen (2006), Defiance (2008), X-Men Origins: Wolverine (2009), Taking Woodstock (2009), Salt (2010), Goon (2011), Pawn Sacrifice (2014), Spotlight (2015), The 5th Wave (2016), and The French Dispatch (2021). He has also lent his voice to animated films such as My Little Pony: The Movie (2017), Isle of Dogs, and Spider-Man: Into the Spider-Verse (both 2018).

Schreiber has also performed in several Broadway productions. In 2005, he won the Tony Award for Best Featured Actor in a Play for his performance in the play Glengarry Glen Ross. That same year, he made his debut as a film director and writer with Everything Is Illuminated (2005), based on the 2002 novel of the same name. In 2010, he narrated the HBO documentary Magic & Bird: A Courtship of Rivals. For his roles in television, he most notably portrayed the eponymous protagonist of the Showtime drama series Ray Donovan (2013–2020). The role has earned him five Golden Globe Award nominations and three Primetime Emmy Award nominations. He reprised the role in the television film Ray Donovan: The Movie (2022). He also narrates the HBO series Hard Knocks and 24/7, as well as various PBS programs.

Early life
Schreiber was born in San Francisco, California, the son of Heather Milgram, a painter, and Tell Schreiber, an actor and carpenter. His father is Protestant and his mother is Jewish. His maternal grandfather, Alex Milgram, emigrated from Ukraine. Milgram, who was the most significant male in Schreiber's youth, played the cello and owned Pierre-Auguste Renoir etchings, and made his living by delivering meat to restaurants. His mother, who is an aficionada of classical music and Russian literature, has said that she named Liev after her favorite Russian author, Leo Tolstoy, while his father has stated that Schreiber was named after the doctor who saved his mother's life. His family nickname, adopted when Schreiber was a baby, is "Huggy."

When Schreiber was one year old, his family moved to the unincorporated rural community of Winlaw, in the southern interior of British Columbia. Over the next four years, his mother was hospitalized on several occasions and underwent therapy related to a bad experience on LSD that she had near the beginning of her marriage (in San Francisco), according to Schreiber's father. After Schreiber's father threatened to have Schreiber's mother admitted to a mental institution, Schreiber was kidnapped by his mother, eventually leading to his mother gaining full custody of him. They squatted on the Lower East Side in New York City.

Schreiber has described his mother as a "far-out Socialist Labor Party hippie bohemian freak who hung out with William Burroughs". She was "a highly cultured eccentric" who earned a living by splitting her time between driving a cab and creating papier-mâché puppets." In 1983, his mother bought him a motorcycle on his 16th birthday to "promote fearlessness." The critic John Lahr wrote in a 1999 New Yorker profile that, "To a large extent, Schreiber's professional shape-shifting and his uncanny instinct for isolating the frightened, frail, goofy parts of his characters are a result of being forced to adapt to his mother's eccentricities. It's both his grief and his gift." 

Her bohemian proclivities led to actions such as making Schreiber take the Hindu name Shiva Das, wear yoga shirts, consume a vegetarian diet, and briefly attend Satchidananda Ashram in Pomfret, Connecticut when he was 12. Schreiber's mother also forbade her son from seeing color movies. As a result, his favorite actors were Charlie Chaplin, Andrew Cartwright, and Basil Rathbone. In retrospect, Schreiber said in a 2008 interview that he appreciates his mother's influences, saying: "Since I've had Sasha, I've completely identified with everything my mother went through raising me... and I think her choices were inspired."

Subsequently, Schreiber attended Friends Seminary, a Quaker school. In high school,  played the bass clarinet.

Schreiber went on to attend Hampshire College in Amherst, Massachusetts, where he began his acting training at the University of Massachusetts Amherst, via the Five Colleges consortium. In March 1989, he played Antonio in The Merchant of Venice alongside Jeffrey Donovan. He later attended the Yale School of Drama, where he studied with Earle R. Gister and starred in Charles Evered's The Size of the World, directed by Walton Jones. He received a master's degree in drama from Yale in 1992. He also attended the Royal Academy of Dramatic Art in London. He originally wanted to be a screenwriter, eventually settling on acting.

Career

Early films
Schreiber had several supporting roles in various independent films until his big break, as the accused murderer Cotton Weary in the Scream trilogy of horror films. Though the success of the Scream trilogy led Schreiber to roles in several big-budget studio pictures, Entertainment Weekly wrote in 2007 that "Schreiber is [still] best known for such indie gems as Walking and Talking, The Daytrippers, and Big Night."

After Scream, Schreiber was cast as Orson Welles in the HBO original movie RKO 281, for which he was nominated for Emmy and Golden Globe awards. He then played supporting roles in several studio films, including Ron Howard's 1996 remake of Ransom, the 1999 film The Hurricane, A Walk on the Moon; the 2000 movie version of Hamlet, and as a spy in The Sum of All Fears.

The 2004 remake of The Manchurian Candidate, with Denzel Washington and Meryl Streep, was another major film for Schreiber, stirring some controversy as it opened during a heated presidential election cycle. Schreiber also played Robert Thorn with Julia Stiles in the 2006 film The Omen, a remake of the 1976 horror classic. He played the time-traveling ex-boyfriend of Meg Ryan in the 2001 film Kate & Leopold, also starring Hugh Jackman.

Shakespeare
Along with his screen work, Schreiber is a well-respected classical actor; in a 1998 review of the Shakespeare play Cymbeline, The New York Times called his performance "revelatory" and ended the article with the plea, "More Shakespeare, Mr. Schreiber."
A year later, Schreiber played the title role in Hamlet in a December 1999 revival at The Public Theater, to similar raves. In 2000, he went on to play Laertes in the film Hamlet, a modern adaptation of the play.

His performance in the title role of Henry V in a 2003 Central Park production of that play caused The New Yorker magazine critic John Lahr to expound upon his aptitude for playing Shakespeare characters. "He has a swiftness of mind," Lahr wrote, "which convinces the audience that language is being coined in the moment. His speech, unlike that of the merely adequate supporting cast, feels lived rather than learned."

From June to July 2006, he played the title role in Macbeth opposite Jennifer Ehle at the Delacorte Theater.

Narration and voiceover work
Schreiber has narrated a number of documentaries, many of them aired as part of PBS series such as American Experience, Nova, and Secrets of the Dead from 2001 to 2011. He is the voice behind the television commercials for Infiniti. In 1995, he provided narration for the BBC/WGBH documentary co-production Rock & Roll. In 1994, he narrated Two Billion Hearts, the official film of 1994 World Cup.

Schreiber is also the voice of HBO's Sports of the 20th Century documentaries. Similarly, Schreiber is the narrator of HBO Boxing's Countdown and 24/7 documentary series. Schreiber served as the voice of Skeletor in the 2002 incarnation of Masters of the Universe. He narrated Magic & Bird: A Courtship of Rivals and Broad Street Bullies in 2010  as well as Runnin' Rebels of UNLV in 2011, on HBO, and provided the narration for the "Making of Pumping Iron" documentary included in a special anniversary edition of the movie Pumping Iron. He also narrated the History Channel specials Ape to Man, The Lost Kennedy Home Movies, and America: The Story of Us.

Schreiber reprised his role as narrator for HBO's 24/7: Road to the Winter Classic NHL documentary, which followed the Pittsburgh Penguins and Washington Capitals as they prepared to face each other in the 2011 NHL Winter Classic at Heinz Field, in Pittsburgh, Pennsylvania, on January 1, 2011. Once again, Schreiber was the narrator for the HBO series, 24/7 : Road to the Winter Classic. That year, the Philadelphia Flyers and the New York Rangers battled in the Classic, at Citizens Bank Park in the 2012 NHL Winter Classic. Once more, Schreiber narrated for the HBO series in 2014 for the 2014 NHL Winter Classic, which showcased the Toronto Maple Leafs against the Detroit Red Wings at Michigan Stadium in Ann Arbor, Michigan.

Schreiber has been the narrator in HBO's Hard Knocks for every season, except for the 2007 season  when Paul Rudd filled that role, with the Kansas City Chiefs. He also narrated the 2011 documentary Hitler's G.I. Death Camp on the National Geographic Channel. Released in 2012, Kinderblock 66: Return to Buchenwald was narrated by Schreiber, as was the 2013 documentary Money for Nothing: Inside the Federal Reserve. He provided the voiceover for the 2018 Kia Stinger GT commercial.

Directing and 2000s work

Schreiber told The New Yorker in 1999, "I don't know that I want to be an actor for the rest of my life." For a time in the late 1990s, he hoped to produce and direct an adaptation of The Merchant of Venice starring Dustin Hoffman.

During that time, Schreiber started writing a screenplay about his relationship with his Ukrainian grandfather, a project he abandoned when, according to The New York Times, "he read Jonathan Safran Foer's hit novel, Everything Is Illuminated, and decided Mr. Foer had done it better." Schreiber's film adaptation of the short story from which the novel originated, which he both wrote and directed, was released in 2005. The film, which starred Elijah Wood, received lukewarm-to-positive reviews, with Roger Ebert calling it "a film that grows in reflection."

In 2002, he starred in Neil LaBute's play The Mercy Seat along with Sigourney Weaver off-Broadway that was critically and commercially very successful. In the spring of 2005, Schreiber played the role of Richard Roma in the Broadway revival of David Mamet's Pulitzer Prize-winning play Glengarry Glen Ross. As Roma, Schreiber won a Tony Award for Best Performance by a Featured Actor in a Play. In 2006, Schreiber was invited to join the Academy of Motion Picture Arts and Sciences.

In the fall of that year, he directed and starred in the "2006 Join the Fight" AIDS campaign for Cable Positive and Kismet Films (others involved with the campaign included actress Naomi Watts, fashion designer Calvin Klein, and playwright Tony Kushner).

Schreiber played Charlie Townsend in the 2006 film The Painted Veil, starring opposite Watts and Edward Norton. In the same year, Schreiber also appeared in The Omen, which was a remake of the 1976 film of the same name. For television, the actor portrayed a character who temporarily replaces Gil Grissom (played by William Petersen) on CSI: Crime Scene Investigation (2006–07 season) as Michael Keppler, a seasoned CSI with a strong reputation in various police departments across the nation, before joining the veteran Las Vegas team.

Schreiber joined the cast on January 18, 2007, and shot a four-episode arc. He appeared in the Broadway revival of Eric Bogosian's Talk Radio. The show began previews at the Longacre Theatre on February 15, 2007, in preparation for its March opening. On May 11, 2007, he won the Drama League Award for distinguished performance for his portrayal of shock jock "Barry Champlain" in Talk Radio, and has received Tony, Drama Desk, and Outer Critics Circle Award nominations for the role. The New York Times''' Ben Brantley called his performance "the most lacerating portrait of a human meltdown this side of a Francis Bacon painting." Schreiber played the womanizing Lotario Thurgot in Mike Newell's screen adaptation of Love in the Time of Cholera, released in 2007. In a January 2007 interview, Schreiber mentioned that he was working on a screenplay.

Late in 2008, Schreiber portrayed Jewish resistance fighter Zus Bielski in the film Defiance, alongside Daniel Craig. In 2009, Schreiber played the mutant supervillain Victor Creed in the Marvel Comics film X-Men Origins: Wolverine, released on May 1, 2009. In March 2010, he was interested in returning for Scream 4, portraying Cotton Weary a fourth time (the film was subsequently made without his involvement).

In 2010, he returned to Broadway in A View from the Bridge for which he received a Tony nomination for Best Leading Actor in a Play. Schreiber narrates Superheroes: A Never-Ending Battle, a three-hour documentary that premiered on PBS in October 2013.

2015–present

Schreiber co-starred in the 2015 film Spotlight, which won the Screen Actors Guild Award for Outstanding Performance by a Cast in a Motion Picture. Schreiber co-starred alongside Janet McTeer in Les Liaisons Dangereuses on Broadway, with Schreiber cast as the Machiavellian seducer Vicomte de Valmont. The play ran from October 2016 to January 2017.

In 2017, Schreiber returned to play Ross "The Boss" Rhea in Goon: Last of the Enforcers.

During the story development for Logan, Liev had been approached about the potential of Victor Creed to return to the X-Men film universe. Following the film's release, Hugh Jackman revealed that early versions of the script included the character but that element was eventually removed from the final screenplay.

In 2017, Liev was cast to voice the Storm King, the main antagonist in the 2017 film My Little Pony: The Movie, based on the show My Little Pony: Friendship Is Magic. On his acceptance of the part, Liev said that, because of his kids' exposure to his adult-oriented movie work, he wanted something more child-friendly for them to watch.

In 2018, he was part of the ensemble cast of the animated film Isle of Dogs, which premiered at the 68th Berlin International Film Festival; and voiced the supervillain Kingpin in the animated film Spider-Man: Into the Spider-Verse.

In the year 2019, Schreiber had a supporting role in A Rainy Day in New York, which was written and directed by Woody Allen. The same year, he starred in the lead role for Human Capital, where he also served as a producer. In a second collaboration with filmmaker Wes Anderson, he appeared in The French Dispatch in the role of an unnamed talk show host. The film was originally set to be released in 2020, but it was delayed numerous times due to the COVID-19 pandemic before being planned for a release in July 2021. The film subsequently premiered at the Cannes Film Festival on July 12 and was released theatrically in the U.S. on October 22, 2021.

Schreiber worked on a film adaptation of Across the River and Into the Trees. In the film, he played the leading role of Colonel Richard Cantwell, originally set to be played by Pierce Brosnan.

In 2020, Showtime ended the drama series Ray Donovan, in which Schreiber starred, after the 7th season. As a conclusion to the series, a Ray Donovan film was released in January 2022. Schreiber co-wrote the script along with the director David Hollander.

Personal life
Schreiber was in a relationship with British-Australian actress Naomi Watts (with whom he appeared in The Painted Veil). Their first son was born in 2007, and their second son was born in 2008. On September 26, 2016, Schreiber and Watts separated after 11 years together.

Schreiber has lived in a loft apartment in Noho, in Lower Manhattan in New York City, that was shown in Architectural Digest''.

Filmography

Film

Television

Theatre

Awards and nominations

References

External links

 
 
 
 Interview with Details
 Interview with Men's Vogue
 Interview with W magazine

1967 births
Living people
20th-century American male actors
21st-century American male actors
21st-century American writers
Alumni of RADA
American male film actors
American male screenwriters
American male Shakespearean actors
American male stage actors
American male television actors
American male television writers
American male video game actors
American male voice actors
American people of German descent
American people of Ukrainian-Jewish descent
Audiobook narrators
Drama Desk Award winners
Fellows of the American Academy of Arts and Sciences
Film directors from San Francisco
Film producers from California
Friends Seminary alumni
Hampshire College alumni
HIV/AIDS activists
Jewish American male actors
Male actors from New York (state)
Male actors from New York City
Male actors from San Francisco
Outstanding Performance by a Cast in a Motion Picture Screen Actors Guild Award winners
People from the Lower East Side
Screenwriters from California
Tony Award winners
University of Massachusetts Amherst alumni
Yale School of Drama alumni